The Re di Anfo is a stream (or torrente) in the Province of Brescia, Lombardy. Its source is on Cima Meghè and it flows into Lago d'Idro at Anfo on the western side of the lake. Its entire course is contained within the territory of the Commune of Anfo.

A short stretch of the river is suitable for the sport of canyoning.

References
Canyoning sul Re di Anfo 

Rivers of Italy
Rivers of Lombardy
Rivers of the Province of Brescia